Mark Ellidge (1940 – 9 January 2010) was a British press photographer.

Ellidge worked as a photographer for The Sunday Times for nearly 40 years, starting 1 June 1971. He specialised in the performing arts, but also did portrait photography of individuals in the news.

He married three times, lastly to Marinka. He had two daughters, Annaliese and Saffron. Ellidge was half-brother to musician Robert Wyatt and played some piano on his 1970 solo album The End of an Ear.

References

External links 
 Mark Ellidge - Image Archive at ArenaPAL

2010 deaths
British photojournalists
The Sunday Times people
1940 births